Buckland Priory (also known as Minchin Buckland Preceptory or Buckland Sororum (Latin: "Buckland of the Sisters")) was established around 1167 in Lower Durston, Somerset, England.

Priory
It was founded by William de Erleigh (or Erlegh) for Augustinian Canons. A local spring fed fishponds (or vivarium) and supplied the priory with water and drainage. The ponds were filled in by 1725.

The buildings burned down in 1234. The priory was later suppressed, and the estates given to the Knights Hospitaller. Subsequently, there was a priory of Canonesses of St. Augustine, and, in 1199 a preceptory of Knights Hospitaller, the Hospitallers' only house for women in England, who ceased to appoint preceptors after 1433.

Burials
Robert Hill (died 1423) and wife Isabel Fitchet

Dissolution
At the Dissolution of the Monasteries Buckland was dissolved in 1540. The Hospitallers had granted a 50-year lease of their lands in 1539 to William Hawley or Halley. Following Dissolution Hawley received a lease of the property from the crown, and in 1545 together with Alexander Popham he purchased the freehold, then called "the manor and late preceptory of Buckland Priors". Hawley bought out his partner Popham later in 1545. In 1548 he held 300 acres of former Buckland Priory land. The property was later the seat of Sir Gabriel Hawley (d.1604), Sheriff of Somerset in 1584.

Present day
The site of one of the buildings is now occupied by Buckland Farm a Grade II* listed building.

References

Further reading
 

Monasteries in Somerset
1167 establishments in England
1539 disestablishments in England
Augustinian monasteries in England
Preceptories of the Knights Hospitaller in England
Christian monasteries established in the 12th century